The 2020–21 ICE Hockey League season began on 25 September 2020. The league's new title sponsor is bet-at-home.com. Due cancelling last season in the quarter-finals, there was no defending champion. On 20 April 2021, EC KAC won the Austrian Hockey Championship for the 32nd time in their history.

Teams

Standings

Regular season 
Legend:

Placement round

Qualification round

Playoffs

References

External links 

Erste Bank Eishockey Liga Statistics

Austrian Hockey League seasons
2020–21 in European ice hockey leagues
2020–21 in Italian ice hockey
2020–21 in Hungarian ice hockey
2020–21 in Slovak ice hockey